Aaron Stone Pierre (born 7 June 1994) is an English actor.

Early life
Pierre is from South London. He was into athletics and sprinting as a child and developed an interest in acting as a teenager. He joined the Croydon Young People's Theatre (CRYPT) once he moved areas. He took Performing Arts at Lewisham College before going on to train in Toronto and at the London Academy of Music and Dramatic Art, graduating in 2016.

Career

Early work
Pierre appeared in 2 episodes of the BBC One series The A Word and played a Roman soldier Antonius in series 1 of the Sky Atlantic series Britannia. In 2018, he began starring as Dev-Em in the Syfy series Krypton.

That same year, Pierre starred as Cassio in Othello at Shakespeare's Globe. For his performance, he received an Ian Charleson Award commendation. He played the King opposite Lenny Henry in the 2019 production of King Hedley II at the Theatre Royal Stratford East.

Breakthrough
American director Barry Jenkins saw Pierre in Othello and sent him a message after, inviting him to audition for his new series. Pierre landed the role of Caesar in The Underground Railroad, which would be released on Amazon Prime in May 2021.

In July 2021, Pierre appeared as Mid-Sized Sedan / Brendan in M. Night Shyamalan's film Old.

In August 2021, it was reported that Pierre would reteam with Barry Jenkins as a young Mufasa in a Lion King film. In October 2021, Pierre joined the cast of the upcoming films Rebel Ridge (after John Boyega stepped down for family reasons) and Foe, an adaptation of the novel of the same name by Iain Reid.

In February 2022, Pierre joined the cast of the upcoming superhero film Blade, set in the Marvel Cinematic Universe and scheduled to be released on September 6, 2024.

He received a Canadian Screen Award nomination for Best Supporting Performance in a Film at the 11th Canadian Screen Awards in 2023, for his performance as Francis in the film Brother.

Filmography

Film

Short film

Television

Stage

Awards and nominations

References

External links

Living people
1994 births
21st-century English male actors
Alumni of the London Academy of Music and Dramatic Art
Black British male actors
English male Shakespearean actors
English male stage actors
English male television actors
English people of Jamaican descent
English people of Sierra Leonean descent
People from the London Borough of Bexley